Clostridium lundense is a lipolytic, strictly anaerobic, mesophilic and spore-forming bacterium from the genus of Clostridium which has been isolated from fluid of a cow rumen in Lund in Sweden.

References

 

Bacteria described in 2006
lundense